Italy women's national rugby union team are the national women's rugby union team that represents Italy at international level.
It has been administered by the Italian Rugby Federation since 1991; previously, since its inception in 1985 up to 1991, it was administered by UISP – Unione Italiana Sport Popolari (Italian Union for People's Sports), an association which promotes amateur sports at every level of the society. The team competes in the Rugby World Cup, the Rugby Europe Women's Championship and the Women's Six Nations Championship.

History 
On June 22, 1985 the Italian women's national team made their international debut against France. The match ended 0–0, they played again a year later in Bardos, with France winning 12–0. Italy scored their first points in their third match against France when the two neighbors met in Rome in 1987, France won 16–4.

In 1988 Italy participated in the first European championship organized in Bourg-en-Bresse in France by the local women's club. In addition to the hosts, the other two participants were Great Britain and the Netherlands. Italy finished last with three losses. The inaugural edition of this championship, while significant for being the first competition for women's national teams, was never recognized as official by FIRA.

Italian Rugby Federation entry 
In 1991 the management of women's rugby was handed over to the Italian Rugby Federation. Their first commitment was the selection of the team for the inaugural edition of the World Cup which was held in April of that same year in Wales. The Azzurre, after having finished last in their pool, were placed in the Plate quarter-finals. They had their first victory in the tournament after defeating Sweden 18–0 in the Plate quarter-final but lost to Canada 6–0 in the Plate semi-final.

The progress of the national team was slow. In their first 15 years of existence, up to the end of 2000, they played in only 33 official matches. In 1995 they came third in the European championship organized at home in Treviso, a result equaled one year later in Madrid, Spain. After a first round elimination with a sixth place finish at the 1997 European Championship, they finished 12th at the 1998 Women's Rugby World Cup in the Netherlands.

They finished 7th at the 1999 European Championship and 8th in 2001. They won their first Nations Cup title in Veneto in 2002 ahead of the Rugby World Cup, in which Italy finished in twelfth place. Italy won the 2005 European Championship which was held in Hamburg in Germany. In the 2006 Nations Cup Italy successfully defended their title.

Admission to the Six Nations 
In December 2006, the Executive Committee of the Six Nations decided to align the composition of all competitions of the tournament with the men's, which included England, Wales, Ireland, Scotland, France and Italy; at the time the only difference with the women's tournament was the presence of Spain, which the committee replaced with Italy starting in 2007.

Records

Rugby World Cup

Six Nations

Rugby Europe Women's Championship

Overall 
See: List of Italy women's national rugby union team matches

(Full internationals only)
Correct as of 11 February  2023

Players

Current squad
Italy named their final 32-player squad on the 21 September 2022, for the 2021 Rugby World Cup.

See also
 Italy national rugby union team

References

External links
 Federazione Italiana Rugby official site

 
national
European national women's rugby union teams